Miss Perú 2011, the 59th Miss Perú 2011 pageant was held at the Real Felipe Fortress Convention Center, in Callao, Perú on June 25, 2011. At the end of this event Giuliana Zevallos, Miss Perú 2010 and Alexandra Liao, Miss Perú World 2010 crowned their successors Natalie Vértiz and Odilia García respectively. Around 24 contestants from all over the country competed for the titles and the pageant was broadcast live on Panamericana Televisión.

Placements

Special Awards
 Best Regional Costume - Cuzco - Miluska Huaroto
 Miss Photogenic - Pasco - Della Rivera
 Miss Elegance - Loreto - Nicole Faverón
 Miss Body - USA Peru - Natalie Vértiz
 Best Hair - Amazonas - Giselle Patrón
 Miss Congeniality - San Martin - Sofía Cornejo
 Most Beautiful Face - Pasco - Della Rivera
 Best Smile - Junín - Odilia García
 Miss Internet - Tacna - Sherina Ruiz
 Miss Talent Show - Villa Rica - Katerine Villayzan

Delegates

Amazonas - Giselle Patrón
Apurimac - Carmen Vizcarra
Arequipa - Adriana Conde
Ayacucho - Yessenia Espinoza
Cajamarca - Roxana Díaz
Callao - Mayra Farje
Cuzco - Miluska Huaroto
Distrito Capital  - Grace Mejía
Huancavelica - Wendy Llanos
Huánuco - Kenia Brack
Junín - Odilia García
La Libertad - Gisela Torres

Lambayeque - Luciana Onetti
Loreto - Nicole Faverón
Moquegua - Tamara Zapata
Pasco -  Della Rivera
Piura - Carla Gutiérrez
Region Lima - Cindy Mejía Santamaría
San Martín - Sofia Cornejo
Tacna - Sherina Ruiz
Trujillo - Stefani Bueno Obado
Tumbes - Lia Lemor
USA Peru - Natalie Vértiz
Villa Rica - Katerine Villayzan

Judges

Félix Moreno - Regional President of Constitutional Province of Callao

Gudmer Chacón - Kinesiologist

Anahí - Mexican Singer

Alexander Gonzáles - Personal Trainer

Luis Miguel Ciccia - Manager of Transportes CIVA

Walter Cruzálegui - Plastic Surgeon

Roselia Strocchia - Mrs. Venezuela International 2011

Olga Zumarán - Miss Perú Universe 1978

Victor Hugo Montalvo - Manager of MONTALVO Salon & Spa

Carlos Montalvo - Manager of MONTALVO Salon & Spa

Luis Alberto Roy - Manager of "Personal Training GYM"

Maripili Barreda - Peruvian Actress

Juan Sotomayor García - Mayor of Bellavista District

Background Music

 Opening Number - Katy Perry - "Firework"

 Swimsuit Competition - Katy Perry - "Teenage Dream" & "California Gurls"

 Evening Gown Competition - Paul Michael Glaser, Michele Marsh & Topol - "Sunrise, Sunset"

References

External links
Official Site

Miss Peru
2011 in Peru
2011 beauty pageants